Gustavo Fiorini (born April 7, 1919 in Budrio) was an Italian professional football player.

1919 births
Year of death missing
Italian footballers
Serie A players
A.C. Ancona players
U.C. Sampdoria players
Inter Milan players
Association football midfielders
Atletico Piombino players